Sloley is a surname. Notable people with the surname include:

Alex Sloley (born 1991), British disappearance victim
Charlie Sloley (1906–1996), Australian rules footballer
Richard Sloley (1891–1946), British footballer

See also
Slaley (disambiguation)